Jonathan Lloyd (born 30 September 1948) is a British composer.

Lloyd's early teachers included Emile Spira.  Lloyd continued his studies at the Royal College of Music, where he was a recipient of the Mendelssohn Scholarship.  His orchestral work Cantique, which he wrote whilst at the RCM, was featured in the 30-Year Retrospective of the Society for the Promotion of New Music (SPNM) in 1973.  He continued to study composition with John Lambert and Edwin Roxburgh, as well as Henri Pousseur at Durham.  In 1973, Lloyd attended the Tanglewood Music Center in the USA, where he studied with Gyorgy Ligeti, and where he won the Koussevitsky Prize for his work Scattered Ruins.  In 1978-1979, he was composer-in-residence at the Dartington College of Arts in its theatre department.

Lloyd began to achieve wider recognition with his 1981 work Toward the Whitening Dawn, which he composed in memory of John Lennon.  He has composed works on commission from such ensembles as the London Sinfonietta, the BBC Symphony Orchestra, and Birmingham Contemporary Music Group.  In addition to works for the concert hall, Lloyd has composed a new score to accompany the silent version of Alfred Hitchcock's 1929 film Blackmail.

Selected compositions

Chamber ensembles

Orchestral and concertante works

Choral and vocal works

Music theatre works
 Musices Genus
 Scattered Ruins

References

External links
 Boosey & Hawkes page on Jonathan Lloyd
 Royal Philharmonic Society, RPS Elgar Bursary recipients page on Jonathan Lloyd
 Colin Anderson, 'BBC Symphony Orchestra/Andrew Davis – Jonathan Lloyd’s old racket & Tippett 4 – Stephen Hough plays Brahms'.  Classical Source website, 12 April 201

1948 births
Living people
British classical composers